Arrowhead was a professional football player who played in the National Football League during the 1923 season. That season, he joined the NFL's Oorang Indians. The Indians were a team based in LaRue, Ohio, composed only of Native Americans, and coached by Jim Thorpe. Arrowhead was a member of the Chippewas.

He played in only 4 games in 1923 with the Indians, however he scored 2 touchdowns during that time. On November 11, 1923, Arrowhead caught a pass from Thorpe for the Indians only score in 14–7 loss to the St. Louis All-Stars. On December 2, 1923, he caught a 15-yard pass from Emmett McLemore for a score in a 22–19 loss to the Chicago Cardinals.

References

Uniform Numbers of the NFL

Notes

Year of birth missing
Year of death missing
Miami University alumni
Native American players of American football
American football tight ends
American football wide receivers
Oorang Indians players